Free Shia Movement (Al-Tayar Al-Shi'iy Al-Hurr) is a Lebanese Shi'ite political movement allied with the Lebanese opposition March 14 Alliance and opposed to mainstream Shi'ite movements allied with the March 8 Alliance, namely Hezbollah and Amal Movement.

It is headed by Sheikh Mohammad Al Hajj Hassan and is opposed to the alleged political hegemony of Hezbollah and the Amal Movement on the Shi'ite community in Lebanon. It also opposed the intervention of Hezbollah in Syrian civil war.

References

External links
Free Shiite Movement Official site

2006 establishments in Lebanon
Political parties established in 2006
Islamic political parties in Lebanon
Politics of Lebanon
Political organisations based in Lebanon
Shia Islamic political parties
March 14 Alliance